Robert Rice was an American football and basketball coach. He was the fourth head football coach at Northwest Missouri State Teacher's College—commonly known then as Maryville now known as Northwest Missouri State University—in Maryville, Missouri, serving for twos seasons, from 1919 to 1920, and compiling a record of 0–7. Rice was also the head basketball coach at Northwest Missouri State from 1919 to 1921.

Head coaching record

Football

References

Year of birth missing
Year of death missing
Northwest Missouri State Bearcats football coaches
Northwest Missouri State Bearcats men's basketball coaches